The British military network in Iran, an intelligence gathering network that infiltrated the Iranian Armed Forces, dates back to the World War II years and is distinguishable from the long-standing local civilian network run by the British in Iran.

Activities

1940s 
In early January 1942, the British Defence Security Organization in Tehran (DSO) was established. The main objective of the British network at the time, was to thwart the efforts of German Abwehr network in Iran.

1950s 
MI6 compiled an "impressive military Who's Who" –detailed personal profiles about Iranian military personnel that included trivial information– with the help of this network, that proved useful in plotting the 1953 Iranian coup d'état. A major function of the network was promotion of its own members while keeping others, especially leftists out of important positions.

Known assets
The following military personnel are known to act as assets for the network, as of early 1950s:
 Gen. Hassan Arfa, former chief-of-staff
 Col. Teymour Bakhtiyar, later director of SAVAK
 Col. Hedayat Gilanshah, personal adjutant to the shah and later Air Force commander
 Col. Hussein-Ghuli Ashrafi, a brigade commander in the Tehran garrison
 Col. Hassan Akhavi, former commander of Second Bureau

1960s

Known assets
The following military personnel were closely associated with the British, as of 1960s:
 Gen. Teymour Bakhtiyar, director of SAVAK
 Gen. Mehdi Qoli Alavi-Moqadam, chief of police
 Gen. Haj-Ali Kia, commander of Second Bureau

See also 
 Bushire Under British Occupation

References 

Spy rings
MI6 operatives in Iran
British military intelligence informants
Iran–United Kingdom relations